The Unique Quartette was a black vocal quartet in New York City. Founded in the mid-1880s by Joseph Moore, they are best known for a handful of wax cylinder recordings made in the first half of the 1890s. They are the earliest known black vocal group to have been commercially recorded, with their first recordings made in December 1890 for the New York Phonograph Company.

Several of their wax cylinders survive, most recorded by the North American Phonograph Company, and are among the earliest extant recordings of any African-American musicians, along with recordings by George W. Johnson and a single surviving cylinder recorded by Louis Vasnier.

The earliest surviving wax cylinder recording of the Unique Quartette — and thus the earliest surviving recording by any African-American musical group (as opposed to soloist, since George W. Johnson's “The Whistling Coon” predates this by two years) — is Edison 694, “Mamma’s Black Baby Boy,” recorded in 1893. There are two copies left: one is in the Library of Congress and one is privately owned. This may also be the earliest Barbershop quartet recording by any quartet of any ethnicity, providing further evidence that Barbershop is of African-American origin, being derived from the Negro spiritual and being part of the gap between the Spiritual and later but still early African-American musical styles and genres such as Blues and Jazz.

References

External links
Sound clip of The Unique Quartette

African-American musical groups